Sergejs Boldaveško (born October 9, 1970 in Rīga, Latvian SSR, Soviet Union) is a retired Latvian ice hockey forward, who played for Dinamo Riga later HK Pārdaugava Rīga of the Soviet Hockey League, Liepājas Metalurgs and various German regional teams. He also was a part of Latvian national team during its resurrection after fall of Soviet Union.

References

External links

1970 births
Living people
Augsburger Panther players
Dinamo Riga players
EV Füssen players
HC Lada Togliatti players
Latvian ice hockey forwards
HK Liepājas Metalurgs players
Ice hockey people from Riga
Vojens IK players